Põrgupõhja uus Vanapagan (The New Devil of Hellsbottom, English release title: Devil with a False Passport) is a 1964 Estonian film directed by Grigori Kromanov and Jüri Müür, and based on the 1939 novel of the same name by A. H. Tammsaare. The film was produced by Tallinnfilm.

Cast
 Elmar Salulaht as Vanapagan 
 Ants Eskola as Kaval-Ants 
 Astrid Lepa as Juula 
 Leida Rammo as Lisete
 Heino Mandri as Pastor
 Olev Eskola as Constable 
 Kaarel Karm as Doctor
 Jüri Järvet as Peetrus 
 Jaan Saul as Kustas
 Eili Sild as Maia 
 Lea Unt as Rila 
 Oskar Liigand as Neighbor
 Hugo Laur as Filth hauler 
 Ervin Abel as Ditchdigger 
 Einari Koppel as Stone breaker
 Ants Jõgi as Peat cutter
 Ines Aru as Bride
 Mikk Mikiver as Young Ants
 Robert Gutman as Young Jürka
 Helmut Vaag as Auctioneer  
 Aado Hõimre as Constable

References

External links
 
 Põrgupõhja uus Vanapagan, Estonian Film Database (EFIS)

1964 films
Estonian drama films
Estonian-language films
Films directed by Grigori Kromanov